Japan competed at the 2013 Summer Universiade in Kazan, Russia from 6 July to 17 July 2013. 417 athletes were a part of the Japanese team.

Japan won 84 medals (2nd place after Russia), including 24 gold medals (3rd place after Russia and China).

Medal summary

Medal by sports

Medalists

References

Nations at the 2013 Summer Universiade
Japan at the Summer Universiade
2013 in Japanese sport